Karanjit Singh Parmar (born 8 January 1986) is an Indian professional footballer who plays as a goalkeeper for Indian Super League club Kerala Blasters.

Club career 
Born in Hoshiarpur, Punjab, India, Karanjit started playing football at the age of 15. He was spotted at a local tournament by the former India national team head coach Sukhwinder Singh. Subsequently, he was called for JCT in 2004, where he spent six seasons. He moved to Salgaocar in 2010 and won the 2010–11 I-League in debut season.

Chennaiyin 
Karanjit was drafted by Indian Super League club Chennaiyin in 2015 ISL player auction. He appeared in four league games in the 2015 ISL but didn't managed to keep any clean sheets. Chennaiyin won the their first ever ISL title with a 3–2 win against Goa in the final and Karanjit won his second league title. In January 2016, he was loaned out to Salgaocar for the 2015–16 I-League. He signed a two-year contract extension with Chennaiyin in July 2017 ahead of the 2017–18 ISL season. Karanjit kept seven clean sheets in 2017–18 ISL, a joint record for the season  and Chennaiyin won their second ISL title and first Indian title with a 3–2 win against Bengaluru in the 2018 ISL final. On 31 August 2019, he signed a one-year contract extension which also made him a goalkeeping coach at the club. On 5 September 2020, Chennaiyin announced that Karanjit had signed a one-year contract extension which kept him at the club till the end of 2020–21 season.

Kerala Blasters 
On 21 December, it was announced that Kerala Blasters, the rivals of his old club Chennaiyin has signed Karanjit as a replacement for injured Albino Gomes.

Despite making no appearance for the Blasters in the 2021–22 season, Karanjit signed a one-year contract extension for the Blasters on 30 May 2022. He made his debut for the Blasters on 29 January 2023 in a 2–0 win against NorthEast United FC, where he also kept a cleansheet.

International career 
Karanjit made his debut for India against the United Arab Emirates on 23 July 2011 coming off the bench for red carded goalkeeper Subrata Pal. On 11 December 2011, he helped India win the 2011 SAFF Cup with a 4-0 victory of Afghanistan. He started all of India's five matches and kept three clean sheets while only conceding two goals throughout the tournament.

International career statistics

Honours 

Salgaocar
I-League: 2010–11
Federation Cup: 2011
Indian Super Cup; runner-up: 2011
Durand Cup: 2014

Chennaiyin
 Indian Super League: 2015, 2017–18
 Indian Super League; runner-up: 2019–20
Super Cup; runner-up: 2019

Kerala Blasters
 Indian Super League; runner-up: 2021–22

India
 SAFF Championship: 2011, 2015; runner-up: 2013
 Nehru Cup: 2012

References

External links 
 
 

Indian footballers
1986 births
Living people
Footballers from Hoshiarpur
I-League players
Salgaocar FC players
India international footballers
Chennai City FC players
Chennaiyin FC players
Indian Super League players
India youth international footballers
Association football goalkeepers
JCT FC players
Kerala Blasters FC players